G-protein coupled receptor-associated sorting protein 2 is a protein that in humans is encoded by the GPRASP2 gene.

References

Further reading